Edward G. Somerville (March 1, 1853 – October 1, 1877) was a Major League baseball player from 1875 to 1876. He played with the Philadelphia Centennials, New Haven Elm Citys, and  Louisville Grays as an infielder. He had a .200 batting average for his career.  He died at age 24 of alcohol consumption.

References

Sources

1853 births
1877 deaths
Major League Baseball second basemen
Philadelphia Centennials players
New Haven Elm Citys players
Louisville Grays players
19th-century baseball players
London Tecumseh players
Baseball players from Pennsylvania